The War on Drugs is a film documentary on the War on Drugs. It shows how the War on Drugs is being fought on various fronts: In Colombia the film follows the efforts to eradicate the coca and poppy plants under Plan Colombia. In the United States the cases of Richard Paey and Sharanda Jones illustrate the effects for individuals and society. Above all hovers the Drug Enforcement Administration.

The films first public screening was on March 20, 2007 at the Diagonale film festival in Graz, Austria. It was theatrically released in Austria on October 12, 2007 and in Spain on January 17, 2008. The film was also immediately released on the Internet via doc-air, an Internet download platform which became part of DOC Alliance in 2009.

The War on Drugs is the second film from Parallel Universe.

See also
War on Drugs
Plan Colombia
Pablo Escobar
Drug Enforcement Administration (DEA)

References

External links 
 The War on Drugs
 Diagonale
 

2007 films
Documentary films about American politics
2000s American films